Wicked Man's Rest is the debut and sole studio album of the British band Passenger (stylized as /Passenger.) fronted by Mike Rosenberg. The single "Walk You Home" taken from the album charted in Britain reaching number 134 in the UK Singles Chart.

Since the release of the album, Passenger has split up, with lead singer Mike Rosenberg continuing with a solo career also under the name Passenger.

Track listing

Singles
"Wicked Man's Rest"
"Walk You Home"
"Do What You Like"
"Table for One"

References

2007 debut albums
Passenger (British band) albums